Pigeon is a common name for birds of the taxonomic family Columbidae, particularly the rock pigeon.

Pigeon may also refer to:

Places 

 Pigeon, Indiana, an unincorporated community
 Pigeon, Michigan, a village
 Pigeon, Wisconsin, a town
 Pigeon, West Virginia, an unincorporated community
 Pigeon Township (disambiguation)
 Pigeon Point, Minnesota, a peninsula
 Pigeon Mountain (disambiguation)
 Pigeon Peak, Colorado
 Pigeon Spire, British Columbia, Canada, a peak
 Pigeon Key, Florida, a small island
 Pigeon Island (disambiguation)
 Pigeon Lake (disambiguation)
 Pigeon River (disambiguation)
 Pigeon Creek (disambiguation)

People 
 Charles Pigeon (1838–1915), French inventor of the Pigeon lamp
 David Pigeon, 18th century New England militia commander
 Jean Pigeon (1654–1739), French astronomer/cartographer
 Louis-Joseph Pigeon (1922–1993), Canadian politician
 Michel Pigeon (born 1945), Canadian politician
Pamela Pigeon (born 1918), New Zealander who was the first female commander in Britain's Government Communications Headquarters
 Steven Pigeon (born 1960), American politician

Nicknames

 Glenn McGrath (born 1970), Australian former cricketer nicknamed "Pigeon"
 Jandamarra (born 1873), Aboriginal Australian warrior known as Pigeon by the European settlers

In the military 
 HMS Pigeon, various Royal Navy ships
 USS Pigeon, three US Navy ships
 Project Pigeon, World War II project to use pigeons to control guided missiles

Entertainment 
 Pigeons (album), by indie rock band Here We Go Magic
 "Pigeon" (song), by Cannibal Ox
 "Pigeon" (Pushing Daisies), an Emmy Award-winning episode of Pushing Daisies
 Pigeon (film), a 2004 Canadian short film
 "The Pigeon" (Australian Playhouse), a 1966 Australian television play
 The Pigeon (1969 film), a 1969 American made-for-television crime drama film
 Pigeons, alternate title to the 1970 film The Sidelong Glances of a Pigeon Kicker
 The Pigeon (novella), a novella by Patrick Süskind
 "The Pigeon," the title character of a series of children's picture books, starting with Don't Let the Pigeon Drive the Bus!, by Mo Willems

Other uses 
 Pigeon (Korean company), a South Korean manufacturer of household products
 Gatard Statoplan Pigeon, a French 1970s light utility airplane

See also 
 Pidgeon (disambiguation)
 Pidgin (disambiguation)
 Stool pigeon